Thomas O'Malley may refer to:
 Thomas Francis O'Malley (1889-1954), American politician
Thomas O'Malley (congressman) (1903–1979), U.S. Representative from Wisconsin
Thomas J. O'Malley (1868–1936), American politician, lieutenant governor of Wisconsin
Thomas O'Malley (writer), Irish writer
Thomas P. O'Malley (1930–2009), American Jesuit and academic
Tom O'Malley (born 1960), former American Major League Baseball player
Tom O'Malley (American football) (1925–2011), American football player
T. J. O'Malley (1915–2009), American aerospace engineer
Thomas O'Malley, the alley cat in the film The Aristocats

See also
 O'Malley (disambiguation)
 Thomas (disambiguation)
 Tom (disambiguation)